Amrose Benson Coller (September 6, 1885 – June 6, 1951) was a member of the Wisconsin State Senate.

Biography
Coller was born on September 6, 1885, in Marquette, Wisconsin. On July 10, 1910, he married Anna Christine Martin. He died on June 6, 1951, in Madison, Wisconsin.

Career
Coller was a member of the Senate during the 1939 and 1941 sessions. He was a Republican.

References

External links
The Political Graveyard

People from Marquette, Wisconsin
Republican Party Wisconsin state senators
1885 births
1951 deaths
20th-century American politicians